Austria v West Germany may refer to:
 Austria v West Germany (1978 FIFA World Cup), also known as the Miracle of Córdoba
 West Germany v Austria (1982 FIFA World Cup), also known as the Disgrace of Gijón